Germany participated in the Junior Eurovision Song Contest 2021 in Paris, France. Pauline represented the country with the song "Imagine Us", having won the national final  on 10 September, organised by the television station KiKa.

Background 

Children's station KiKa, a joint venture of the German national broadcasters ARD and ZDF, broadcasts the event within Germany and organises the selection of the nation's entry. NDR had set up a national final for the 2020 contest with several artists to choose the first German entry, "Stronger with You" performed by Susan Oseloff, which placed last out of twelve competing songs, scoring 66 points.

Before Junior Eurovision

Junior ESC – Wer fährt nach Paris? 
 was the competition that selected Germany's entry for the Junior Eurovision Song Contest 2021. On 1 June 2021, KiKa opened the application window where children aged between 9 and 14 were able to apply for the competition until 25 June 2021 and over 100 applications were received. Five candidates were selected by an expert panel to go through to the online vote and were announced on 23 July 2021.

Online vote 
On 23 July 2021, performance clips of each of the five candidates performing a cover song of their choice were released online via KiKa's official website and users had until 31 July to vote for their favourite candidate. On 3 August 2021, KiKa announced the top three candidates selected to proceed to the national final.

Final 
Each of the three finalists performed two candidate Junior Eurovision songs selected by them from three already produced songs, provided by composers signed to record companies, entitled "", "", and "Imagine Us". After the first round, one finalist was chosen by public voting and advanced to the second round. The winning song was then selected in the second round from the two songs. The jury panel included Hannah from the broadcaster KiKa, and two music experts consisting of artists  and Gabriel Kelly. They provided feedback in regards to the songs during the show, but had no voting power.

At Junior Eurovision
During the opening ceremony and the running order draw, which both took place on 13 December 2021, Germany was drawn to perform first on 19 December 2021, preceding Georgia.

At the end of the contest, Germany received 61 points, placing 17th out of 19 participating countries.

Performance 
Pauline performed the song "Imagine Us" along with two dancers, Angelina and Marah, with a crowd of cartoon characters shown on the LED screen behind the performers. The song, written by Alexander Henke, Torben Brüggemann, Ricardo Muñoz and Patrick Salmy, was in German and English. During the performance, rainbows, hearts and peace signs are shown. Those symbols are also shown on protest signs held by the cartoon characters and the two dancers.

Voting

Detailed voting results
The following members comprised the German jury:
 Leene Stuhr
 Carl Johannes Höft
 
 
 Mo

References 

2021 in Germany
Countries in the Junior Eurovision Song Contest 2021
Junior